Anton Börsch (1854, Kassel – 1920, Bad Wildungen) was a German geodesist, astronomer, and geophysicist.

In 1904 Börsch was an Invited Speaker of the ICM in Heidelberg.

Selected publications
as editor and translator with P. Simon: 
with Louis Krüger:

References

1854 births
1920 deaths 
19th-century German astronomers
German geodesists
20th-century German astronomers
German geophysicists